Benjamin Daniel Sommers is an American physician and health economist. He is a professor of Health Policy and Economics at the Harvard T.H. Chan School of Public Health and a primary care physician at Brigham and Women's Hospital. He was chosen by Joseph R. Biden to be a deputy assistant secretary for planning and evaluation (DASPE) for Health Policy (HP) in the Department of Health and Human Services (HHS). He currently lives in Brookline, Massachusetts.

Education
Sommers received his B.A. in English from Princeton University in 2000, his Ph.D. from Harvard University in health policy in 2005, and his M.D. from Harvard Medical School in 2007. He completed his residency in internal medicine and primary care at Brigham & Women’s Hospital in 2010.

Research
Sommers is known for studying the effects of health care laws in the United States, such as the Affordable Care Act and Massachusetts health care reform, on outcomes such as access to and utilization of healthcare, mortality rates, and insurance plan cancellations.

References

External links
Interview in the Princeton Alumni Weekly

 Harvard School of Public Health faculty
Living people
Health economists
Princeton University alumni
American economists
Harvard Medical School alumni
American primary care physicians
Year of birth missing (living people)
Place of birth missing (living people)
Members of the National Academy of Medicine